Stramigioli is an Italian surname. Notable people with the surname include:

Giuliana Stramigioli (1914–1988), Italian businesswoman and academic
Stefano Stramigioli (born 1968), Dutch engineer

Italian-language surnames